The Bennett Nunataks are two rock nunataks  apart, lying 0.5 nautical miles north of Lackey Ridge in the Ohio Range of the Horlick Mountains. They were surveyed by the United States Antarctic Research Program Horlick Mountains Traverse party in December 1958, and named by the Advisory Committee on Antarctic Names for John B. Bennett, a geomagnetist-seismologist at Byrd Station, 1960.

References 

Nunataks of Marie Byrd Land